"Nocturne" is a song performed in Norwegian by Secret Garden and the winning entry for  at the Eurovision Song Contest 1995. For their performance at the contest, the Secret Garden duo of Fionnuala Sherry and Rolf Løvland featured three guest musicians: Norwegian vocalist Gunnhild Tvinnereim, Hans Fredrik Jacobsen on penny whistle, and Swedish nyckelharpist Åsa Jinder.

Eurovision victory
The song was performed fifth on the night, following 's Davorin Popović with "Dvadeset prvi vijek" and preceding 's Philip Kirkorov with "Kolibelnaya dlya vulkana". At the close of voting, it had received 148 points, placing 1st in a field of 23.

The victory represented the second for composer Rolf Løvland, who had previously written "La det swinge". Additionally, it represented the first time in four years that  had not won the Contest (although Sherry herself is Irish), thus bringing to an end the only hat-trick of victories in Eurovision history. Ireland would go on to win the next Contest, achieving the feat of four victories in five years.

As Norway had previously won the contest in 1985, the second victory allowed the tongue-in-cheek tradition to emerge that Norway could only win in years ending with a 5, a joke referred to by the members of Bobbysocks at the Congratulations special in late 2005, Norway having entered "In My Dreams" that year and not achieved victory.

It was succeeded as Norwegian representative that year by Elisabeth Andreassen with "I evighet".

Lyrics
The song is noted for its almost complete absence of lyrics  with only 24 words being sung in the original Norwegian version and much of the rest of the song being given over to a violin intermezzo performed by Irish musician Fionnuala Sherry.

While no other winning song in the contest has featured so few words,  would go on to place 15th in the 1998 contest with "Aava", which contains only six words repeated throughout the song. The previous holder of the record of shortest lyrics in Eurovision history was Belgium and their  entry "Rendez-vous", with a total of 11 words.

Releases
"Nocturne" was not released as a single in Norway itself. The song was however released as a single by Secret Garden in the rest of Europe and Scandinavia, then in its English language version, and reached #1 in Israel (topping the chart for 4 weeks), #6 in Belgium (Flanders), #20 in the Netherlands, #24 in Belgium (Wallonia) and #26 in Sweden.

"Nocturne" is included in Secret Garden's first album, Songs from a Secret Garden. The album Inside I'm Singing (2007) includes a new version.

Critical reception
Music & Media said that "Nocturne not only meant a victory of music over fast food, but also held an unprecedented first of an essentially instrumental song." Alan Jones from Music Week wrote, "It is a haunting, pastoral piece, owing more to the Gaelic culture of lone violinist Fionnuala Sherry than to Nordic music. With so little in the way of vocals, it barely qualifies as a song. After the initial 20 seconds, the singer lapses into silence for another two minutes, returning only for 15 seconds at the end."

Covers

Dusty Cowshit version (1996)
The song was covered comedic and first released as a single by the country-inspired novelty band Dusty Cowshit, reaching #16 on the Norwegian singles chart in 1996.

Celtic Woman version (2011)
"Nocturne" was featured on Celtic Woman: Believe, the seventh studio album by the group Celtic Woman, released on 25 May 2011. "Nocturne" was sung by Chloë Agnew. Agnew also performed "Nocturne" live on both  the Believe and Emerald concerts.

Usage in other media
"Nocturne" was used of several episodes of TVN soap opera Oro Verde.

Charts

Secret Garden version

Weekly charts

Year-end charts

Dusty Cowshit version

References

Eurovision songs of Norway
Eurovision songs of 1995
Secret Garden (duo) songs
Eurovision Song Contest winning songs
Songs written by Rolf Løvland
Philips Records singles
1995 singles
1995 songs
Instrumentals
Number-one singles in Israel